General elections were held in Monaco on 4 February 1973, with a second round of voting on 11 February. The result was a victory for the National and Democratic Union, which won 16 of the 18 seats in the National Council.

Results

By party

First round

Second round

References

Elections in Monaco
Monaco
General
Monaco